The Escondido Public Library is a public library system serving the city of Escondido, which is situated in San Diego County, California.
The collection of the library contains 166,629 volumes, circulates 514,792 items per year and serves a 
population of 151,613 residents.

The library system consists of the Main Branch and the Pioneer Room (the Escondido Public Library's local history and genealogy archive).

History

Origins
The Library had its start when, in 1890, the Escondido Dramatic Club began to use its profits to purchase books and make them available at a local school "for the use of the pupils and the general public". The Escondido Public Library first opened its doors in February 1891.

The Escondido Public Library Association was established in 1893 and tasked with finding more a more permanent location for the public library. Thus, the Library moved to the Bank of Escondido, located at the corner of Grand Avenue and Lime (now Broadway). On the March 13, 1893 meeting of the association, the by-laws and constitution were adopted and a week later, the Library Board of Trustees were elected for a term of one year.

The first library and becoming a City department

In 1894, the Escondido Land & Town Company donated two lots of land to the Escondido Public Library. The first library building was a small one-room building located on the eastern end of Grand Avenue. This library served the community until 1910. The building was moved to Grape Day Park in 1971.

In April 1898, the City of Escondido took over the Library's operation, making the Library a City department.

The second (Carnegie) and third libraries
Mrs. W.H. Baldridge, as secretary of the Library Board of Trustees, appealed to Carnegie Library committee for funding to build a new library. With Andrew Carnegie funds, and a gift of land, a new library was built in 1910 on Kalmia and Third Avenue.

In 1956, because of limited space to serve a community of over 6,000, a new library building, now the Mathes Center, was constructed on the same spot. By 1980, Escondido had grown to 67,000 persons and the library incorporated children's and audiovisual services.

The current library and the East Valley Branch
Through the efforts of the Library Board of Trustees and City officials, revenue-sharing funds were set aside for a new facility. Library operations were moved in December 1980 into the present two-story,  building. 

In June 1996, the  East Valley Branch was opened in the East Valley Community Center on East Valley Parkway. In 2011, the East Valley Branch Library was closed. 

In January 2013, the Escondido Technology Center (ETC) was re-opened in part of the original space of the East Valley Branch. In June 2016 the ETC was closed. 

In December 1996, the Pioneer Room was opened in the Mathes Center adjacent to the main library.

Pioneer Room
Located in the brick Mathes Center building next to the Main Library on 247 S. Kalmia Street, the Pioneer Room was established in 1992, with bequest from local historian Frances Beven Ryan (1901–1990). The research room and archives is a part of the Escondido Public Library that provides the community non-circulating reference material. The local history collection includes books, journals, photographs, and archival material. The family history genealogy research material primarily contains reference books.

Grand Jury Report

In March 2016, the San Diego County Grand Jury issued a report after "questions [were] raised concerning the adequacy of the library to server the community."

The 2016/2017 Grand Jury Report found that:

 The Escondido Public Library is inadequate to serve the community.
 The Escondido library’s programs do not meet the community needs.
 Unused allocated funds from the Escondido Library operating budget are not used to benefit the library.
 An effective marketing plan is not being employed to attract more people to the library’s resources, programs, and activities.

The City responded disagreeing with many of the findings.

Outsourcing library services
On October 18, 2017, the Escondido City Council voted 4-1 to contract with Maryland-based Library Systems & Services to operate the library. Councilmembers Ed Gallo, Michael Morasco, John Masson, and Mayor Sam Abed voted in favor of the 10-year contract, with councilmember Olga Diaz in opposition.

References

External links
City of Escondido
Escondido Public Library
Map of the Main Branch

Library buildings completed in 1910
Public libraries in California
Carnegie libraries in California
Libraries in San Diego County, California
Escondido, California